Kownacki (feminine: Kownacka; plural: Kownaccy) is a Polish surname. It may refer to:

 Adam Kownacki (born 1989), Polish-American boxer
 Dawid Kownacki (born 1997), Polish association football player
 Edmund Knoll-Kownacki (1891–1953), Polish military officer
 Gabriela Kownacka (1952–2010), Polish actress
 Maria Kownacka (1894–1982), Polish writer
 Rafał Kownacki (born 1980), Polish lawyer

See also
 

Polish-language surnames

pl:Kownacki